Paul-Luis Eckhardt (born 14 November 2000) is a German footballer who plays as a midfielder for Chemnitzer FC.

References

External links
 Profile at FuPa.net

2000 births
Living people
German footballers
Association football midfielders
Chemnitzer FC players
3. Liga players